Thomas Prosser (born 15 December 1960) is a West German former ski jumper.

External links

1960 births
Living people
German male ski jumpers
Place of birth missing (living people)
20th-century German people